Ajay K. Kohli is the Gary T. and Elizabeth R. Jones Chair at Scheller College of Business, Georgia Institute of Technology. He is known for his work on market orientation, marketing theory and marketing strategy. He is a former editor-in-chief of the Journal of Marketing. He is a fellow of the American Marketing Association. He is among the 100 most cited authors in the fields of Business and Economics combined in a decade, and two of his articles are among the 10 most cited Journal of Marketing articles in a quarter century. He is represented in ISIHighlyCited.com, an ISI web site from the Institute for Scientific Information that lists the top 0.5% cited authors in two decades in a variety of social and natural sciences combined.

Selected publications
Kohli, Ajay K., and Bernard J. Jaworski. "Market orientation: the construct, research propositions, and managerial implications." The Journal of Marketing (1990): 1-18.
Jaworski, Bernard J., and Ajay K. Kohli. "Market orientation: antecedents and consequences." The Journal of Marketing (1993): 53-70.
Kohli, Ajay K., Bernard J. Jaworski, and Ajith Kumar. "MARKOR: a measure of market orientation." Journal of Marketing Research (1993): 467-477.
Tuli, Kapil R., Ajay K. Kohli, and Sundar G. Bharadwaj. "Rethinking customer solutions: From product bundles to relational processes." Journal of Marketing 71, no. 3 (2007): 1-17.
Challagalla, Goutam, R. Venkatesh, and Ajay K. Kohli. "Proactive postsales service: when and why does it pay off?." Journal of Marketing 73, no. 2 (2009): 70-87.
Zeithaml, V. A., Jaworski, B. J., Kohli, A. K., Tuli, K. R., Ulaga, W., & Zaltman, G. "A Theories-in-Use Approach to Building Marketing Theory." Journal of Marketing 84, no.1 (2020), 32–51.

References

External links
 https://www.scheller.gatech.edu/directory/faculty/kohli/index.html

Living people
Marketing theorists
Marketing people
Georgia Tech faculty
Fellows of the American Marketing Association
Year of birth missing (living people)
University of Pittsburgh alumni
Journal of Marketing editors
Emory University faculty